Lebong Tandai is one of the villages in the subdistrict of Napal Putih, North Bengkulu Regency, Bengkulu province, Indonesia.

The village is known as a gold mining area since the Dutch colonial era in 1910. After Indonesia became independent in 1945, gold mines and relics of the Dutch building was taken over by the Lebong Tandai people.

References

Populated places in Bengkulu